Sergio Calatayud Lebrón (born 2 March 1990), known as Cala, is a Spanish footballer who plays as a midfielder for UD Torre del Mar.

Club career
Cala was born in Antequera, Province of Málaga. Raised in local Málaga CF's youth ranks, he made his senior debut with the reserves in the Tercera División. He played his first competitive match with the first team on 3 March 2011, coming on as a substitute for Quincy Owusu-Abeyie in the 69th minute of a 7–0 La Liga away loss against Real Madrid.

After leaving the La Rosaleda Stadium, Cala represented in quick succession CF Fuenlabrada, CD El Palo and Real Jaén, with all the clubs competing in the Segunda División B. He moved abroad for the first time on 22 July 2016, signing with Allsvenskan side Jönköpings Södra IF for the remainder of the season and leaving in early June 2017.

References

External links

1990 births
Living people
People from Antequera
Sportspeople from the Province of Málaga
Spanish footballers
Footballers from Andalusia
Association football midfielders
La Liga players
Segunda División B players
Tercera División players
Tercera Federación players
Atlético Malagueño players
Málaga CF players
CF Fuenlabrada footballers
CD El Palo players
Real Jaén footballers
Antequera CF footballers
Allsvenskan players
Jönköpings Södra IF players
Spanish expatriate footballers
Expatriate footballers in Sweden
Spanish expatriate sportspeople in Sweden